Lakhdar Rakhroukh (born 13 November 1958 in Algiers) is the Algerian Minister of Public Works, Hydraulics and Basic Infrastructure. He was appointed on 9 September 2022.

Education 
Rakhroukh holds a Diploma in Civil Engineering (1984) from the National Polytechnic School.

References

External links 

 Ministry of Public Works, Hydraulics and Basic Infrastructures

Living people
21st-century Algerian politicians
Algerian politicians
Government ministers of Algeria
Public works ministers of Algeria
Year of birth missing (living people)